Amjad Radhi Yousif Al-Janabi (born 17 July 1990) is an Iraqi professional footballer who currently plays for Erbil in the Iraqi Premier League. He won the 2009–10 Iraqi Premier League and 2012–13 Iraqi Premier League top scorer awards, as well as the 2012 AFC Cup top scorer award.

Club career
The youngster's goal-scoring rate is remarkable even by Asian standards. He scored a remarkable 31 goals in the 2009/10 Iraqi Premier League season. Having finished last year’s AFC Cup as top-scorer with Arbil with nine goals, he has continued to cause havoc this season, being on target four times as his side established a six-point cushion at the summit.

He scored an impressive 23 goals during the 2011–12 Iraqi Premier League to help his Erbil to the title and win his first Iraqi premier league title.

Radhi served a one-year suspension from football in 2019 after four prohibited substances were found in his sample.

International career
He made his debut for Iraq against Jordan in September 2010, he scored his first goal for Iraq on December 18, 2012 in a match against Oman.

International goals

Scores and results list Iraq's goal tally first.

Honours

Club
Erbil SC
Iraqi Premier League: 2011–12
AFC Cup runner-up: 2012, 2014

Al-Quwa Al-Jawiya
 Iraqi Premier League: 2016–17, 2020–21
 Iraq FA Cup: 2020–21
 AFC Cup: 2016, 2017, 2018

International
WAFF Championship runner-up: 2012

Individual
Iraqi Premier League top scorer: 2009–10, 2012–13
AFC Cup joint top scorer: 2012

References

External links
 
 

Al-Quwa Al-Jawiya players
Iraqi footballers
1990 births
Living people
Erbil SC players
Al-Raed FC players
Smouha SC players
Egyptian Premier League players
Iraq international footballers
Sportspeople from Baghdad
Association football forwards
Saudi Professional League players
Expatriate footballers in Saudi Arabia
Iraqi expatriates in Saudi Arabia
AFC Cup winning players